Nia Walcott (born 3 March 1993) is an American-raised Trinidad and Tobago footballer who plays as a midfielder for the Trinidad and Tobago women's national team.

International career
Walcott played for Trinidad and Tobago at senior level in the 2020 CONCACAF Women's Olympic Qualifying Championship qualification.

International goals
Scores and results list Trinidad and Tobago' goal tally first.

References

External links

1993 births
Living people
Women's association football midfielders
Trinidad and Tobago women's footballers
Trinidad and Tobago women's international footballers
American women's soccer players
Soccer players from Washington, D.C.
African-American women's soccer players
American people of Trinidad and Tobago descent
Howard Bison women's soccer players
21st-century African-American sportspeople
21st-century African-American women